Uncanny X-Men, originally published as The X-Men, is an American comic book series published by Marvel Comics since 1963, and is the longest-running series in the X-Men comics franchise. It features a team of superheroes called the X-Men, a group of mutants with superhuman abilities led and taught by Professor X.

The title was created by Stan Lee and Jack Kirby, met with a lukewarm reception, and was eventually cancelled in 1970. Interest was rekindled with 1975's Giant-Size X-Men #1 and the debut of a new, international team. Under the guidance of David Cockrum and Chris Claremont, whose 16-year stint began with August 1975's Uncanny X-Men #94, the series grew in popularity worldwide, eventually spawning a franchise with numerous spin-off "X-books", including New Mutants, X-Factor, Excalibur, X-Force, Generation X, and other flagship titles like the simply titled X-Men (later New X-Men and X-Men Legacy), Astonishing X-Men, All-New X-Men, Amazing X-Men, Extraordinary X-Men and X-Men Gold.

Publication history

1963–1970: Original run
Created by writer-editor Stan Lee and artist Jack Kirby, the series launched in September 1963, introducing in its first issue the original five X-Men (Warren Worthington III/Angel, Hank McCoy/Beast, Scott Summers/Cyclops, Robert "Bobby" Drake/Iceman, and Jean Grey/Marvel Girl) and their teacher, Charles Xavier/Professor X as well as their nemesis, the supervillain Erik Magnus Lehnsherr/Magneto. Although Lee would deny it, it was noticed by contemporary writer Arnold Drake, that the concept of the series emulated his own earlier series for National Periodical Publications's (Now DC Comics), The Doom Patrol, in many respects. However, National's editorial staff did not support Drake's concerns.

Initially published bimonthly, it became a monthly with issue #14 (November 1965). Lee's run lasted 19 issues, and featured the X-Men battling villains such as Magneto's Brotherhood of Mutants (which included the siblings Wanda Maximoff/the Scarlet Witch and Pietro Maximoff/Quicksilver); the Sentinels, giant robots programmed to destroy all mutants, and their creator Bolivar Trask; and Cain Marko/the Juggernaut, Xavier's stepbrother transformed by a mystical gem and seeking revenge on Xavier.

The series was placed firmly in the Marvel Universe, with guest appearances by Namor MacKenzie/Namor the Sub-Mariner in #6 and the Avengers in #9. The jungle adventure hero Kevin Plunder/Ka-Zar and the Savage Land were introduced in issue #10. Roy Thomas wrote the series from #20-44 (May 1966-May 1968). Thomas and artist Werner Roth created Sean Cassidy/the Banshee in #28 (Jan. 1967). The X-Men #45 (June 1968) featured a crossover with The Avengers #53 (June 1968). After brief runs by Gary Friedrich and Arnold Drake – the latter of whom introduced the new X-Men Lorna Dane/Polaris and Alex Summers/Havok, and during which the series adopted a new logo designed by Jim Steranko – Thomas returned to the series with issue #55 and was joined by artist Neal Adams the following issue for an acclaimed run of stories. After a battle with the Hulk in issue #66 (March 1970), the title ceased publishing original material and featured reprints in issues #67-93 (Dec. 1970-April 1975).

1970-1975: The Hidden Years
Despite the title going into reprints for the next five years between #67-93, the X-Men continued to appear in other Marvel titles throughout this period in a guest-starring capacity or cameo appearance, either as a team or in solo adventures.

The Angel appears without the X-Men in a three-part story involving the murder of his father at the hands of his uncle, Burt Worthington, aka the Dazzler, in Ka-Zar #2 (Dec. 1970) and #3 (March 1971), and Marvel Tales #30 (April 1971).

Iceman makes a solo appearance in Amazing Spider-Man #92 (Jan. 1971), where he battles Spider-Man after mistakenly assuming he abducted Gwen Stacy. Later, after realizing his error, they team up against corrupt politician, Sam Bullitt. Iceman appears alone once again in Marvel Team-Up #23 (July 1974), where he teams up with the Human Torch to battle the Equinox. Cyclops, Marvel Girl, and Angel also make a brief appearance.

The Beast stars in his own series in Amazing Adventures #11-17 (March 1972-March 1973) after accepting a position with the Brand Corporation, and decides to leave the X-Men for good. The original team appears briefly in a flashback in #11 (March 1972) and in a present-day cameo appearance in #15 (November 1972). Professor Xavier and Marvel Girl briefly appear in Amazing Adventures #12 (May 1972), and the Angel helps the Beast defeat the Griffin in Amazing Adventures #15. After his run on that title ends, the Beast battles against the Hulk alone in Incredible Hulk #161 (March 1973).

Havok and Polaris, as recounted in a flashback in Incredible Hulk #150 (April 1972), leave the X-Men after a bitter quarrel with Iceman and move to New Mexico. In a present-day appearance in the same issue, they encounter and battle the Hulk, who mistakes Polaris for his former lover Jarella, and a biker gang. 

As a team, the X-Men assist Spider-Man in capturing Michael Morbius in Marvel Team-Up #4 (Sept. 1972) after one of Xavier's colleagues is abducted by the vampire. In Adventure into Fear #20 (Feb. 1974), it is recounted in a flashback how Morbius escapes from the X-Men's mansion. Professor Xavier and Cyclops make a brief cameo appearance. 

They appeared in The Avengers #110-111 (April-May 1973), written by Steve Englehart, where Professor Xavier and the X-Men are abducted by Magneto after an ambush at Xavier's mansion, and later rescued by the Avengers, Daredevil, and the Black Widow. Soon after, members of the X-Men, including Iceman, Angel, Beast, Havok and Polaris, and members of the Brotherhood of Evil Mutants are secretly being abducted by a group of hooded figures known as the Secret Empire. At this point, only Professor Xavier, Cyclops and Marvel Girl remain active, and, after a brief cameo at the end of Incredible Hulk #172 (Feb. 1974), where they discover an unconscious Juggernaut after a battle with the Hulk, seek out the help of Captain America and the Falcon. This led to the first "Secret Empire" storyline, which ran in Captain America #172-175 (April-July 1974), also written by Steve Englehart.

Even Professor Xavier made a few brief appearances of his own without the X-Men during this time. In The Avengers #88 (May 1971), written by Roy Thomas and Harlan Ellison, he makes a cameo appearance assisting Reed Richards and General Thunderbolt Ross in containing the Hulk. He later appears briefly in Shanna the She-Devil #5 (Aug. 1973) to warn Shanna of the unknown mutant threat, Nekra. In The Defenders #15-16 (Sept-Oct. 1974), written by Len Wein, Xavier teams up with the Defenders to battle against Magneto and his reformed Brotherhood of Evil Mutants. It was in this battle that Magneto and the Brotherhood were reduced to infancy by Alpha the Ultimate Mutant. Xavier made one final solo appearance during this period in Giant-Size Fantastic Four #4 (Feb. 1975), where he assists the Fantastic Four in subduing Jamie Madrox, the Multiple Man.

1975–1991: Chris Claremont era

X-Men was relaunched in May 1975 with Giant-Size X-Men #1, by Len Wein and Dave Cockrum. The title featured a new, international team consisting of Scott Summers (Cyclops) of the United States, Ireland's Sean Cassidy (Banshee), the Japanese mutant Shiro Yoshida (Sunfire), and James "Logan" Howlett (Wolverine) from Canada, along with new characters Ororo Munroe (Storm) out of Kenya, the German Kurt Wagner (Nightcrawler), Piotr "Peter" Rasputin (Colossus) from Russia in The Soviet Union, and John Proudstar (Thunderbird), a Native American. The original plan was to continue Giant-Size X-Men as a quarterly, but instead original stories were printed in the book, again initially bimonthly. 
Chris Claremont's first issue as writer, #94, featured all the original X-Men leaving the team with the exception of Cyclops. Sunfire also left, having agreed to assist the X-Men on one successful mission only. Thunderbird was killed in #95. Moira MacTaggert, a human ally of the X-Men, and later to be established as a former fiancé of Xavier, debuted in #96. Marvel Girl became Phoenix in issue #101. This was followed by the first Shi'ar space opera story. Cockrum was replaced as penciller by John Byrne as of #108. Byrne became co-plotter, and during his run the series became a monthly title again.

The series title was changed to The Uncanny X-Men with issue #114 (October 1978).

For the remainder of the decade, the X-Men fought enemies such as Stephen Lang and his Sentinels, Magneto, Banshee's cousin Black Tom Cassidy and Cain Marko/the Juggernaut, the Shi'ar Erik the Red and the Imperial Guard, Arcade, Wolverine's former colleagues, the Canadian superhero team Alpha Flight, and MacTaggert's son Proteus. In 2010, Comics Bulletin ranked Claremont and Byrne's run on The X-Men second on its list of the "Top 10 1970s Marvels".

The "Dark Phoenix Saga" in 1980 led to a change in the line-up of the team, with the death of Phoenix (Jean Grey), and Cyclops leaving the team to mourn her. Comics writers and historians Roy Thomas and Peter Sanderson observed that "'The Dark Phoenix Saga' is to Claremont and Byrne what 'the Galactus Trilogy' is to Stan Lee and Jack Kirby. It is a landmark in Marvel history, showcasing its creators' work at the height of their abilities." The storyline also saw the introduction of recurring antagonists the Hellfire Club, and its Inner Circle consisting of Sebastian Shaw, Emma Frost, Harry Leland, Donald Pierce, along with Mastermind, previously a member of Magneto's Brotherhood. Teenage mutant Katherine Anne "Kitty" Pryde/Shadowcat was introduced in #129 (Jan. 1980) and joined the X-Men in #139. Alison Blaire/the Dazzler, a disco-singing, roller-skating mutant, was introduced in #130 (Feb. 1980), but did not join the team, instead having a solo title.

A new Brotherhood of Evil Mutants, led by Mystique, was introduced in the "Days of Future Past" storyline (#141-#142, Jan–Feb 1981) in which a time-travelling Katherine Anne "Kitty" Pryde/Shadowcat tried to avert a dystopian future caused by the Brotherhood assassinating Presidential candidate Senator Robert Kelly. Byrne plotted the story wanting to depict the Sentinels as a genuine threat to the existence of the mutant race. He then left the series after #143, being replaced by a returning Cockrum, who in turn was succeeded by Paul Smith and John Romita Jr.

By the mid-1980s, The Uncanny X-Men had become one of the best-selling American comic books, turning many of the writers and illustrators into industry stars and leading to numerous spin-offs and miniseries.

Erik Magnus Lehnsherr/Magneto was gradually revealed to be more complex: #150 established that he was a survivor of the Holocaust, and in #161 it is shown that Erik Magnus Lehnsherr/Magneto and Professor Charles Xavier had known each other before Xavier had founded the X-Men. Anna Marie LeBeau/Rogue, a member of Raven Darkholme/Mystique's Brotherhood of Evil Mutants, defected to the X-Men in #171 (July 1983). Raven Darkholme/Mystique's Brotherhood of Evil Mutants changed sides and became the government-backed Freedom Force in #199. Their first action was to capture Erik Magnus Lehnsherr/Magneto, who had begun associating with the X-Men during the "Secret Wars II" crossover. Erik Magnus Lehnsherr/Magneto surrenders himself, but escapes after his trial is abandoned, he takes over the headmastership of the school after Xavier leaves for space in #200 (Dec. 1985).

The Morlocks, a group of disfigured mutants living underneath New York City, were introduced in #169 (May 1983). Storm became their leader in #170. She was de-powered accidentally by government forces aiming for Anna Marie LeBeau/Rogue, and met Forge, a mutant with the power of invention. After Storm left the team temporarily to return to her native Africa, Nightcrawler became field leader.

The character Rachel Summers from the future dystopia presented in "Days of Future Past" had been shown to arrive in the present day in New Mutants #18, and then made appearances in Uncanny X-Men from #184 on and was revealed to be Cyclops' daughter.

Claremont attempted to write Scott Summers/Cyclops out of the series, by having him marry Madelyne Pryor in #175 (Nov. 1983); she gave birth to his son in #201 (Jan. 1986). The X-Factor series was launched two months later and featured the original five X-Men. This meant the resurrection of Jean Grey (performed by retcon, the character appearing from #101 having never really been her), and having Scott Summers/Cyclops abandon his wife and child. Claremont strongly objected to the latter, and was hostile towards the title until Louise Simonson became writer.

Artist Arthur Adams began a long association with the team by drawing The Uncanny X-Men Annual #9 (1985) and would serve as the artist on several of the Annuals in the next few years.

The end of 1986 saw the first crossover between X-Men titles, the "Mutant Massacre", which saw a large number of Morlocks killed by the Marauders, acting under orders from the mysterious Nathaniel Essex/Mister Sinister The late 1980s saw several other crossovers: 1988's "Fall of the Mutants" and 1989's "Inferno", which resolved the issue of Madelyne Pryor by revealing her to have been a clone of Jean Grey created by Sinister. The cast was shaken up, with the addition of Psylocke, the Dazzler, Longshot and Havok in early 1987, as well as the first appearances of NPR-TV reporter Manoli Wetherell in #226 (1988), new teenage mutant Jubilation Lee/Jubilee in #244 (1989), and Remy LeBeau/Gambit in Uncanny X-Men Annual #14 (1990). The X-Men left their traditional residence in Westchester County, New York, and lived variously on Alcatraz, Muir Island and in the Australian outback. The "X-Tinction Agenda" crossover, in which the X-Men, X-Factor and the New Mutants fight against the government of Genosha for mutant rights, was published in the fall of 1990.

The title became twice-monthly from 1988 to 1990 every summer, and helped to launch the careers of artists Marc Silvestri and Jim Lee. In 1991 another X-Men title was launched, titled simply X-Men; both titles were now published monthly. Claremont wrote the first three issue of this series, in which the X-Factor and X-Men teams reunited with Professor Xavier at the school. Claremont left Marvel after disputes with Bob Harras and artist Jim Lee (of X-Men). Claremont's final issue of Uncanny X-Men was #279, during the "Muir Island Saga", which is set before those events.

1991–2011: Post-Claremont era

After Claremont's run, the X-Men were divided into two color-coded squads, with a Blue team headlining the adjectiveless X-Men title, while the Gold team, consisting of Warren Worthington III/Archangel, Piotr "Peter" Rasputin/Colossus, Jean Grey, Robert "Bobby" Drake/the Iceman and Ororo Munroe/Storm, appeared in Uncanny. This roster was later joined by Lucas Bishop, another refugee from the future. After Claremont's departure, Jim Lee continued as plotter, while John Byrne scripted from #281-286. Byrne was replaced as scripter from #287 by Scott Lobdell, who was fully credited as writer from #289. The "X-Cutioner's Song" crossover was released in the fall of 1992 and resulted in the outbreak of the Legacy virus, a mutant-specific plague which continued as a story element in X-Men comics until 2001.

Crossovers continued through the 1990s. The "Fatal Attractions" crossover of 1993 saw the X-Men battle Magneto again, and the "Phalanx Covenant" story of 1994 focused mostly on the techno-organic Phalanx. Uncanny X-Men briefly ceased publication during the "Age of Apocalypse" storyline in 1995, which dealt with an alternative present created by a time-travelling assassin killing Xavier; it was replaced by Astonishing X-Men. Lobdell was writing X-Men as well from 1995.

Lobdell was replaced by Steven T. Seagle with issue #350 (Dec. 1997). He was replaced in turn with Alan Davis, as plotter, from issue #366 (Mar. 1999) to #380. Davis's run included "the Twelve" crossover from #370-#375, in which Apocalypse sought the only 12 mutants, which also ran in his X-Men title, again being treated as a biweekly publication. As part of the Revolution relaunch, Chris Claremont made a brief return from #381 (June 2000) to #389, at which point he transferred to the new X-Treme X-Men title, as Grant Morrison took over X-Men (vol. 2) and that became the flagship X-Men title. From 2001, Lobdell made a short return, and then Joe Casey and Chuck Austen wrote runs into 2004. The title became bimonthly from 2003 to 2004.

The X-Men: Reload reshuffle of titles in 2004 led to Claremont returning to Uncanny with issue #444. The stories addressed the new status quo established by Morrison. Claremont remained until #473. His final story was "End of the Greys" in 2006, as part of the "Decimation" storyline, where the vast majority of mutants had lost their powers. He was replaced by Ed Brubaker, who wrote a 12-part epic space opera story "The Rise and Fall of the Shi'ar Empire", as a follow-up to his miniseries X-Men: Deadly Genesis. After this, the title led into the "Messiah Complex" crossover event, dealing with the first mutant birth since the Decimation.

Matt Fraction became co-author from #500, and sole author from #504. The entire X-Men team relocated to San Francisco – first to the city, and then, after the "Utopia" crossover with Dark Avengers, to an island named Utopia in San Francisco Bay. The Nation X storyline focused on the return of the re-powered Magneto, and him coming to Utopia. The Second Coming crossover saw the return of Hope Summers, the baby from the "Messiah Complex" arc, to the present day, as a young adult; and the emergence of the "Five Lights", the first new mutants to have arisen (apart from Hope) since the Decimation. Nightcrawler was killed during this storyline and the Beast left in protest after his discovery of Cyclops' secret death squad X-Force.

Kieron Gillen took over co-authorship of the series with #531, and became sole writer from #534.1.

2011–2012: Volume 2
The original series ended with #544 and relaunched as a new volume after the events of the X-Men: Schism miniseries, wherein half the X-Men, led by Wolverine, returned to New York, to found a new school. The new volume featured the Extinction Team, containing members of the X-Men whom Cyclops had retained to deal with potential threats to the mutant race's survival. Gillen's run led into, and crossed over with, the Avengers vs. X-Men storyline and finished with issue #20 in October 2012. The volume ended with Cyclops, who had become increasingly hardline during Gillen's run, in prison for his actions during that storyline. Gillen wrote a five-part epilogue, AvX: Consequences.

2013–2015: Volume 3

As part of Marvel NOW!, a new volume of Uncanny X-Men was launched in February 2013 with an April 2013 cover date, written by Brian Michael Bendis, who is also writing another X-Men title, All-New X-Men, and drawn by Chris Bachalo. It features Cyclops and remnants of his Extinction Team recruiting new mutants to help them prepare for what Cyclops believes to be an inevitable revolution, coinciding events of the first All-New X-Men story arc. This volume saw Cyclops leading his team to an abandoned Weapon X facility to train new recruits and prepare for impending war against the humans, who see Cyclops as a terrorist's due to his actions in Avengers Vs. X-Men. Eventually, Kitty Pryde and the time-displaced X-Men join his cause after facing a team of X-Men from a dystopian future. It lasted 36 issues, with the final issue reverting to the legacy numbering of Uncanny X-Men #600.

2015–2016: Volume 4 

As part of All-New, All-Different Marvel, Uncanny X-Men was relaunched, written by Cullen Bunn with art by Greg Land. The relaunched Uncanny X-Men team features Magneto leading Psylocke, the Archangel, M, Mystique, Fantomex and Sabretooth, while a different team led by Storm will be called the Extraordinary X-Men. Cyclops's fate after Battleworld is shown to us in the Death of X miniseries (Cyclops was exposed to the Terrigen Mist and died from M-Pox).

The tagline for the relaunched series is "Bigger threats require more threatening X-Men", and is considered to be a continuation of Bunn's previous work on the Magneto solo series. The series will deal with threats that arise as a result of a new, more dangerous world post-Secret Wars. Summing up the team, Bunn states "They're upholding Xavier's dream, but they have no right to do so."

2018–2019: Volume 5 
Announced in August 2018, Uncanny X-Men (vol. 5) debuted November 14, 2018, with the weekly 10-part "X-Men: Disassembled" arc and follows on from the events of the Extermination miniseries. This incarnation of the team features Lucas Bishop, Kurt Wagner/Nightcrawler, Jean Grey, Ororo Munroe/Storm, Elizabeth "Betsy" Braddock/Psylocke, Jean-Paul Beaubier/Northstar, Robert "Bobby" Drake/the Iceman, Hank McCoy/the Beast, Laura Kinney/X-23, Lorna Dane/Polaris, Jubilation Lee/Jubilee, Katherine Anne "Kitty" Pryde/Shadowcat and Sam Guthrie/Cannonball as well as trainee X-Men Hisako Ichiki/Armor, Victor Borkowski/Anole, Megan Gwynn/Pixie, Idie Okonkwo/Oya, Robert Herman/the Glob, Santo Vaccarro/Rockslide. Following the 10th issue, the series began focusing on a new team of X-Men featuring Scott Summers/Cyclops, James "Logan" Howlett/Wolverine, Alex Summers/Havok, Jamie Madrox/the Multiple Man, Rahne Sinclair/Wolfsbane, Illyana Rasputin/Magik, Danielle Moonstar/Mirage, Xi'an Coy Minh/Karma.

After this volume, all X-Men titles were cancelled and two intertwining six-issue miniseries written by Jonathan Hickman, called "House of X" and "Powers of X", began a weekly run in July 2019 and concluded on October of the same year. Shortly after those were completed, the X-Men series relaunched with X-Men #1, accompanied by the other related teams' regular series, such as Marauders, X-Force, Excalibur, New Mutants, X-Corp, Wolverine, X-Men: Giant Size, and reviving 1987's Fallen Angels; all part of the 2019 story arc "Dawn of X", which searches to unite all mutantdom and settle down as a whole species.

Annuals
Like many comic book series, Uncanny X-Men had an associated double-sized Annual series, once in both 1970 and 1971, then regularly from 1979 to 2001. A second series of Uncanny X-Men Annuals began in 2006 as volume 2 issue #1.

Team roster

Volume 1

Volume 2

Volume 3

Volume 4

Volume 5

Timeline

Notes
This is an article about the comic book, and thus the publication history, not the in-continuity history. As such, the above reflects the team roster for the book at time of publication. Similarly, this article only reflects the team roster for the X-Men team whose home is this publication.

Professor X is the Headmaster of Xavier's School for Gifted Youngsters and mentor to the X-Men, but he is rarely (if ever) a member of the X-Men team. In his role as mentor, he has typically been present in the book, but he has notable absences, including issues #43–64 (dead, later retconned as preparing for the Z'Nox), #200–273 (with Lilandra Neramani in Shi'ar space; replaced as Headmaster by Magneto during most of this absence), #340–351 (in government custody after the Onslaught crisis), #379–386 (educating Cadre K in space), and #495–513 (rebuilding his mind in X-Men: Legacy).

Jean Grey was replaced by the Phoenix Force from issues #101-137. This was a retcon that was only revealed years later.

At many times, the team roster has been the same as that appearing in X-Men (vol. 2) and during two periods, the two books have even been treated by their writer as a single bi-weekly title (issues #289–350 by Scott Lobdell and issues #366–380 by Alan Davis).

During issues #370–372, Wolverine was replaced by a Skrull infiltrator, leading to "The Shattering"/"The Twelve" storylines, and the Astonishing X-Men (vol. 2) limited series.

After moving to San Francisco, many other mutants continually appear as background characters or allies, but apart from during crossovers they are rarely considered part of the team roster.

After the series was relaunched as Uncanny X-Men #1, it featured Cyclops's "Extinction Team", composed of himself, Emma Frost, Namor, Magneto, Storm, Hope Summers, Colossus, Danger and Magik; Psylocke was briefly a member of this team while Emma was injured.

Contributors

Authors

Pencilers

Title

Until 2011, Uncanny X-Men remained Marvel Comics' only Silver Age title to retain its consecutive issue numbering since its conception, even during the early 1970s reprint hiatus. The Amazing Spider-Man, The Avengers, The Fantastic Four and other legacy titles have all, at one time or another, restarted their numbering at #1, though all later returned to their original numbering. The final issue to be published under the original numbering was #544, published in October 2011 with a December 2011 cover date, which was followed by a new #1 the following month. In 2015, Marvel released Uncanny X-Men #600, following Vol. 3 #35, as a conclusion to the Brian Michael Bendis' run on both All New X-Men and Vol. 3.

From issue #1-93 the indicia title was The X-Men. After the relaunch with issue #94, and up to #138, the article The was dropped from the indicia title, making it X-Men, but the article was added back in issues #139-141.

The title The Uncanny X-Men was first used in the issue #95 title block following the "Stan Lee Presents:" tagline, though the title did not appear on the covers or indicia titles yet; covers begin displaying this title in #114. Beginning with issue #142 and up to #407, the indicia title was finally changed to The Uncanny X-Men. Issue #408 was the first to use the indicia title Uncanny X-Men.

A separate series, titled simply X-Men, launched with an October 1991 cover date.

Collected editions

Trade paperbacks

Marvel Masterworks

Essentials

Panini Pocket Books

Epic Collections

X-Men Milestones

Other trade paperbacks

Volume 1

Volume 2

Volume 3

Volume 4

Volume 5

Hardcovers

Marvel Masterworks

Oversized hardcovers (OHCs)

Omnibus editions

In other media 
The title card of The Super Hero Squad Show episode "Hexed, Vexed and Perplexed!" is an homage to X-Men #1.

References

External links
Uncanny X-Men at Marvel.com

Uncanny X-Men at the Marvel Database
Uncanny X-Men at the Unofficial Handbook of Marvel Comics Creators

1963 comics debuts
American comics characters
Comics by Arnold Drake
Comics by Brian Michael Bendis
Comics by Chris Claremont
Comics by Ed Brubaker
Comics by Jack Kirby
Comics by Jim Lee
Comics by John Byrne (comics)
Comics by Len Wein
Comics by Matt Fraction
Comics by Neal Adams
Comics by Roy Thomas
Comics by Stan Lee
Comics characters introduced in 1963
Superhero comics
X-Men titles